Ghormach or Ghowrmach is a town in Badghis Province in northwestern Afghanistan. It serves as the center of Ghormach District.

Climate
With a mild and generally warm and temperate climate, Ghormach features a hot-summer Mediterranean climate (Csa) under the Köppen climate classification.

Armed conflict
An International Security Assistance Force (ISAF) soldier (a Norwegian national) was killed in Ghormach on January 25, 2010.

References

External links
Satellite map at Maplandia.com

Populated places in Badghis Province